In enzymology, a thiosulfate-thiol sulfurtransferase is an enzyme that catalyzes the chemical reaction

thiosulfate + 2 glutathione  sulfite + glutathione disulfide + sulfide

Thus, the two substrates of this enzyme are thiosulfate and glutathione, whereas its 3 products are sulfite, glutathione disulfide, and sulfide.

This enzyme belongs to the family of transferases, specifically the sulfurtransferases, which transfer sulfur-containing groups.  The systematic name of this enzyme class is thiosulfate:thiol sulfurtransferase. Other names in common use include glutathione-dependent thiosulfate reductase, sulfane reductase, and sulfane sulfurtransferase.  This enzyme participates in glutathione metabolism.

References

 
 
 

EC 2.8.1
Enzymes of unknown structure